FlyViking AS was a short-lived, Norwegian regional airline with head office in Lyngseidet, Troms and based in Tromsø. FlyViking operated regional flights in the northern parts of Norway.

History
FlyViking was founded in 1989 as Lofotfly. It was renamed Fly Taxi Nord in 2000 and operated Piper PA-31 aircraft, on both cargo- and passenger air charter flights. In November 2015, Ola O.K Giæver Jr., a former employee of Norwegian airline Widerøe, bought the airline and later renamed it FlyViking.

In 2016 FlyViking lost the tender competition on a five-year contract by the Norwegian Ministry of Transport and Communications to operate 13 of Norway's Public Service Obligation routes starting in April 2017. FlyViking and Danish Air Transport lost the tender round, while Widerøe won all of the 13 PSO routes. On February 14, 2017, FlyViking was awarded a new air operator's certificate (AOC) from the Civil Aviation Authority of Norway, the new AOC allowing FlyViking to transport more than 20 passengers on each flight. The airline operated its first scheduled service on 27 March 2017 from Tromsø to Hammerfest and Bodø using a Bombardier Dash 8-100.

On 29 December 2017, FlyViking announced it would cease all operations on 12 January 2018 due to its financial situation. All northern routes were closed that day. While the route between Ørland and Oslo are operated by Danish Air Transport/DOT LT for a new virtual airline created by parent firm Viking Air Norway AS. All flights out of Tromsø have been taken over by its competitor, Widerøe.

Destinations 
The airline operated to the following destinations within Norway:

Fleet 
As of January 2018 FlyViking operates the following aircraft:

References

Defunct airlines of Norway
Airlines established in 2016
2016 establishments in Norway
Airlines disestablished in 2018
2018 disestablishments in Norway
Companies based in Tromsø